Vallea stipularis is a species of tree in the Elaeocarpaceae family. It is native from the Andes mountains in South America.

Description
Evergreen shrub or tree up to 18 meters tall; fissured bark. Kidney-shaped stipules on branchlets. Leaves heart-shaped or pear-shaped, sometimes lobed, up to 10 cm long, dark green above, whitish green beneath, with tufts of hairs in the vein axils. Cymose inflorescence with pinkish-red or crimson bell-shaped flowers; these with five sepals and five three-lobed petals, 9–13 mm long; ovary and styles glabrous; 15–60 stamens. Warty fruits, 1 cm wide, often dehiscing on the tree.

Distribution and habitat
Vallea stipularis is native to the Andes, in montane forest and páramo, between 1600–4000 m of elevation, from Venezuela to Bolivia.

References

Trees of Bolivia
Trees of Colombia
Trees of Ecuador
Trees of Peru
Trees of Venezuela
Elaeocarpaceae